Taiwan folk beliefs are traditional beliefs widely circulated in Taiwan, including Chinese people's beliefs that combine Daoism, Buddhism, and Confucianism," the Chinese immigrant beliefs that merge the three religions, also including the deification of local heroes and celebrities, also including Wang Ye worship, and Taiwanese aborigines's Ancestors. Ancestral Spirituality, the former, along with the China Minnan region and Guangdong immigrants from the South China region, crossed the Taiwan Strait to the east and took root in Taiwan. Gradually, folk beliefs with local styles emerged, but by and large, the original Chinese people's interfaith gods are still worshipped; the second shows that Taiwanese people are full of feelings of tolerance and knowledge, such as worshipping the Japanese soldiers who sacrificed their lives to save the people; the second, such as Ying Gong and Wan Shan Yi in various places, and some are even more spirit, such as Nan Kunshen Dai Some of the latter still retain their original characteristics, while some beliefs (such as Ali-zu beliefs) have been Sinicized. Taiwan is also the most religious region in the Chinese world, with 93% of people following mixture of Buddhism, Confucianism, and Taoism , Christian 4.5%, other 2.5%.

Chinese folk religion in Taiwan is framed by the ritual ministry exerted by the Zhengyi Taoist clergy (sanju daoshi), independent orders of fashi (non-Taoist ritual masters), and tongji media. The Chinese folk religion of Taiwan has characteristic features, such as Wang Ye worship. Even though Falun Gong is banned in China, people in Taiwan are free to practise it.

Gallery 

Taiwanese culture
Religion in Taiwan
Chinese folk religion
Taiwanese folk religion

References

Footnotes

Bibliography